Steering the Craft: Exercises and Discussions on Story Writing for the Lone Mariner and the Mutinous Crew is a 1998 nonfiction book by Ursula K. Le Guin.  Developed from a writers' workshop led by Le Guin, the book contains self-guided exercises and discussions focused on the craft of narrative prose.

In 2015, Le Guin published a revised and rewritten edition of the book with a new subtitle: Steering the Craft: A Twenty-First-Century Guide to Sailing the Sea of Story.

References
Notes

Bibliography

External links 
 excerpt at Le Guin's site
 

Works by Ursula K. Le Guin
Books about writing